Chris Evert and Martina Navratilova were the defending champions, but decided not to play together. Evert partnered with Rosie Casals, but they lost in the second round to Helen Cawley and JoAnne Russell.

Cawley and Russell defeated Navratilova and Betty Stöve in the final, 6–3, 6–3 to win the ladies' doubles tennis title at the 1977 Wimbledon Championships.

Seeds

  Martina Navratilova /  Betty Stöve (final)
  Rosie Casals /  Chris Evert (second round)
  Linky Boshoff /  Ilana Kloss (quarterfinals)
  Françoise Dürr /  Virginia Wade (semifinals)
  Kerry Reid /  Greer Stevens (quarterfinals)
  Sue Barker /  Ann Kiyomura (third round)
  Lesley Charles /  Sue Mappin (semifinals)
  Billie Jean King /  Karen Susman (second round)

Draw

Finals

Top half

Section 1

Section 2

Bottom half

Section 3

Section 4

References

External links

1977 Wimbledon Championships – Women's draws and results at the International Tennis Federation

Women's Doubles
Wimbledon Championship by year – Women's doubles
Wimbledon Championships
Wimbledon Championships